Height restriction laws are laws that restrict the maximum height of structures.

There are a variety of reasons for these measures. Some restrictions limit the height of new buildings so as not to block views of an older work decreed to be an important landmark by a government. For example, in the Russian capital of Saint Petersburg, buildings could not be taller than the Winter Palace.

Other restrictions are because of practical concern, such as around airports to prevent any danger to flight safety.

Height restriction laws sometimes become a point of contention in cities due to their use in regulating the growth of the housing supply. Fast growth of housing supply benefits renters by producing low prices and more choice, while slow or no growth in housing supply benefits property owners by allowing them to charge higher prices. In this way, height restriction laws often become part of a class conflict even when their original purpose was innocuous.

Asia

Malaysia

Buildings in the Petaling Jaya suburb of Kelana Jaya were previously capped at 15 floors (around 50 or 60m in height) because of the close proximity to Subang International Airport, less than 5 km away. The height restriction was lifted in 1998 when commercial jet operations were relocated to the Kuala Lumpur International Airport in Sepang, and this saw higher buildings being erected, notably the 33-floor Ascent and New World Hotel towers at Paradigm Mall Petaling Jaya (the tallest in the area today, with heights of around 150m).

Middle East

Israel and Jordan inherited laws from the days of the British Mandate that prevent buildings from rising more than four stories above the ground except by special government permission. In Amman, these regulations have been credited with maintaining the city's architectural and urban heritage, but have also been accused of inflating housing prices and causing unsustainable urban sprawl.

Philippines

PRESIDENTIAL DECREE No. 1537 dated January 4, 1978 ENTITLED "Providing for the preservation of the walls of Intramuros and the restoration of its original moat and esplanade" by including preservation and restoration of the walled city includes (Section 10) the height of buildings within the Intramuros district shall be based upon the widths of streets on which the building abuts but the total height of the structure shall not exceed 30 meters. No tower shall be 35 meters high measured from the top of the sidewalk.

Hong Kong
To protect the ridge line along Hong Kong Island and in Kowloon, height restrictions are imposed according to the location of the buildings or structures.

Prior to the 1998 closure of the Kai Tak Airport, many places in Kowloon had a stricter building height restriction due to its proximity to the airport.

Indonesia
In Bali, Indonesia, a building cannot be taller than a coconut tree, which is about 15 meters. The only building that is higher than a coconut tree is the Bali Beach Hotel because the hotel was built before the height restriction was announced. The restriction was enforced by a regional regulation, however, how much this is enforced is in question.

Singapore
Buildings in Raffles Place, Marina Centre, Marina Bay Sands, Bugis and Kallang have height restrictions of up to 280m because of the proximity of Paya Lebar Air Base until 2030 as planned.

Europe
In Europe, there is no official general law restricting the height of structures. There are however height restriction laws in many cities, often aimed to protect historic skylines.

In Athens, buildings are not allowed to surpass twelve floors so as not to block the view towards the Parthenon. There are several exceptions though, such as the Athens Tower, the Atrina center and the OTE central building which all exceed that level. This is due to them either being built far away from the centre, or to the fact that they were constructed during periods of political instability. The city's tallest structure is the Athens Tower, reaching 103m and comprising 25 floors.

In the central area of Rome, delimited by the Aurelian Walls, no building can exceed the height of the dome of St. Peter's Basilica, 136 meters. A skyscraper called Torre Eurosky (Eurosky Tower), built in 2012 in EUR neighbourhood (outside the ban area). exceeds this limit being 155 meters high.

There is however a height restriction for new onshore wind turbines in the European Union, which set their total height to 200 metres.

North America

Canada
Canada has no national height restrictions, but many individual cities do have height restriction bylaws and building is restricted by the national aviation authority (Transport Canada) near airports.  Some examples:
 Montreal: until the late 1920s, all buildings were limited to 10 storeys. The downtown today possesses only one building exceeding 200 m, the 1000 de la Gauchetière tower, which was built as a special project in 1992.
 Ottawa-Gatineau: Until 1973, buildings in downtown Ottawa were limited to  so that the Peace Tower, part of the parliament buildings, could dominate the skyline.
 Saskatoon: continues to limit building heights to a maximum of 76 meters due to a flight path that bisects the downtown core, however, the recent proposal of a 90 - 100 meter tower could potentially lead to the lifting of this height limit. 
 Vancouver: maintains "view corridors" that protect views of the North Shore Mountains.  It also has a density bank that allows developers to exceed maximum building height restrictions in exchange for preserving heritage buildings.
 Whitehorse: No buildings should be taller than four stories due to the nearby fault line. The Whitehorse Chamber of Commerce said that maintaining the height restriction of four stories would discourage businesses from coming to the city. In 2007, the city rejected the proposal to increase the height limit to eight stories. In order to exceed height limit, the developer would have to apply for an amendment to the city's official community plan.
 Hamilton: No buildings may exceed the height of the Niagara Escarpment, to preserve views of Lake Ontario from the Escarpment, and vice versa.

United States
This is to prevent those structures from being a hazard to air navigation.

For airports, sometimes there are exceptions for height restrictions made for important infrastructure equipment, as radio towers or for structures older than the airport. These structures have to be marked with red and white paint, have flight safety lamps on top, or both.  Often red and white paint and flight safety lamps have to be installed on high structures (taller than ) far away from airports. Height restriction laws are not always kept strictly.

Several cities in the United States have local height limits, for example:
 Madison, Wisconsin: No building located within one mile of the Wisconsin State Capitol (its dome is 287 ft high) may be higher than it (set in 1966).
 San Jose, California: Due to Downtown San Jose's close proximity to San Jose International Airport, no buildings within city limits surpass .
 Portland, Oregon: Height limits vary between 75 feet to 460 feet throughout the city, with the primary intent being to protect views of Mount Hood and the West Hills.
The height limit was passed by the United States Congress in 1889 as the Height of Buildings Act of 1899 and later amended by the Height of Buildings Act of 1910.
Boston, Massachusetts: Due to the city's proximity to Logan International Airport, building height is restricted to around 800 feet. Furthermore, buildings in Downtown Boston are capped even lower than 700 feet. This is in order to prevent shadows from being cast on both significant historic landmarks and public parks, such as the Boston Common.

References

External links
 FCC policy statement concerning tower heights near airports

Statutory law
Urban planning
Construction law
Housing law